Raymond Schultz (born April 25, 1990) is a Canadian pair skater. With Natasha Purich, he placed fifth at the 2011 World Junior Championships and won the 2011 Canadian junior title. With Maddison Bird, he finished sixth at the 2009 World Junior Championships.

Programs

With Purich

With Bird

Competitive highlights

With Purich

With Bird

References

External links 
 
 

1990 births
Canadian male pair skaters
Figure skaters from Toronto
Living people